Roger Federer was the defending champion, but he lost in the final against Novak Djokovic 4–6, 6–4, 2–6.

Seeds

Draw

Finals

Top half

Bottom half

Qualifying

Seeds

Qualifiers

Lucky losers

Draw

First qualifier

Second qualifier

Third qualifier

Fourth qualifier

External links
Main Draw
Qualifying Draw

Davidoff Swiss Indoors - Singles
- Singles, 2009 Davidoff Swiss Indoors